Forever Lost is the second studio album by Norwegian recording artist A-Lee, released on October 5, 2012 in Norway, on EE Records and Columbia/Sony Music Norway. A-Lee worked with producers Ground Rules, Martin K, Bernt Rune Stray, BPM, Thomas Eriksen, Slipmats and The Products. The original album track list features Aleksander With, Elisabeth Carew and Marcus Only.

The album contains the chart hits, "The One" and "World So Cold", which reached No. 7 and No. 12 on Norwegian Official Charts VG-Lista, respectively.

Track listing

Personnel
Credits for Forever Lost album

Production
 Tim Blacksmith – management
 Jørgen Bratlie – A&R
 Danny D. – management
 Björn Engelmann – mastering
 Thomas Eriksen – producer, engineer, mixer
 Shahrouz Ghafourian – executive producer, management
 Bjarte Giske – producer, engineer, mixer
 Nima Khazai – producer
 Martin Kleveland – producer, instrumentation, engineer
 Rasmus Kongsøre – photography
 Pål Leverton – artwork design
 Berent Philip Moe – producer, instrumentation, mixer
 Marori Morningstar – photography
 Abubaker Noor – producer
 Morten Pape – producer, engineer, mixer
 Bjørn Erik Pedersen – mixer
 Ali Pirzad-Amoli – executive producer, artwork design
 Mats Lie Skåre – producer, engineer
 Bernt Rune Stray – producer, instrumentation, engineer

Musicians
 Elisabeth Carew – vocals
 Bjarte Giske – additional vocals
 Tommy Kristiansen – guitar
 Martin Mulholland – additional vocals
 Marcus Ulstad Nilsen – vocals
 Thea Oskarsen – additional vocals
 Morten Pape – vocals
 Ali Pirzad-Amoli – vocals
 Mats Lie Skåre – vocals
 Olav Verpe – vocals, additional vocals
 Aleksander With – vocals

Release history

References

External links
 A-Lee Official Site

2012 albums
A-Lee albums